Giovanni Ramponi (born 28 November 1956) is an Italian professor of electronics at the University of Trieste whose works have been cited more than 1513 times since 2008.

References

External links
Official site

Academic staff of the University of Trieste
Living people
1956 births
Place of birth missing (living people)
University of Trieste alumni